Gellibrand  was a railway station near Colac, Victoria, Australia. It was located on the now dismantled Victorian Railways narrow gauge Crowes railway line. It was 17 miles 20 chains (27.75 km) from Colac. Originally built with 3 tracks, a 4th was added in 1923. It closed with the closure of the Colac to Beech Forest section of the line in 1962.

The original railway station building survives and displays historical information. The station yard and a portion of the railway reservation is now part of the Old Beechy Rail Trail.

References

External sources
Government railways in Australia of less than 1067 mm gauge

Disused railway stations in Victoria (Australia)